Bid Akhvid (also Romanized as Bīd Ākhvīd, Bīd Akhavīd, Bīdākhavīd, and Bīd Okhvīd; also known as Bīd Okhābīt and Bīda Khābīt) is a village in Banadkuk Rural District, Nir District, Taft County, Yazd Province, Iran. At the 2006 census, its population was 245, in 98 families.

References 

Populated places in Taft County